Giancarlo Ferrero (born 29 August 1988) is an Italian professional basketball player and captain of Pallacanestro Varese in the Italian Lega Basket Serie A (LBA). He is a  small forward.

Professional career

Clubs

Giancarlo Ferrero made his debut in 2003 with A.S. Junior Pallacanestro Casale in Casale Monferrato. At the end of the Serie B regular season, he achieved the promotion to Serie A2 Basket and won the Serie B Cup.

Between 2006 and 2009 he was sent on loan to Valenza, Virtus Siena and Robur Osimo. But in 2009 he returned to Casale.

During the 2010–11 Serie A2 season, Junior Casale won the regular season and went to the playoffs when they achieved the historical promotion to Lega Basket Serie A, the highest-tier level professional league in Italy.

On 9 October 2011, in Sassari, it was the first time for Ferrero in Serie A where he got 8 points. In March 2012 he was sent on loan again to Conad Bologna (Serie A2).

In 2012-13 Serie A season, he returned to Casale (Serie A2), where he reached the 3rd place in regular season and the playoffs' semi-finals.

In 2013 he went to Pallacanestro Trapani, again in Serie A2. He became the team captain of Trapani also in 2014–15 Serie A2 season.

In July 2015 signed a two-year-contract with Pallacanestro Varese (LBA). At the end of the 2015–16 LBA season they reached the 9th place of the regular season, and the 2016 Final Four of the 2015–16 FIBA Europe Cup where they lost in the Finals 62–66 with the German Skyliners Frankfurt.

Italy national basketball team
Giancarlo Ferrere made his debut in the Italy national basketball team in 2009, when he played 4 matches with 28 points. He went to the European Under-18 and Under-20 Championships in 2006 and 2008. In the youth national teams he played 37 matches with 228 points. In 2012 he was summoned to the Senior national team for the friendly matches against Greece and France in Folgaria and Rome.

References

External links
Lega Basket Serie A profile  Retrieved 8 October 2017
Legadue Basket profile  Retrieved 8 October 2017
FIBA profile  Retrieved 8 October 2017
FIBA Europe profile  Retrieved 8 October 2017
FIP profile  Retrieved 8 October 2017

1988 births
Living people
A.S. Junior Pallacanestro Casale players
Fortitudo Pallacanestro Bologna players
Italian men's basketball players
Lega Basket Serie A players
Pallacanestro Trapani players
Pallacanestro Varese players
People from Bra, Piedmont
Power forwards (basketball)
Sportspeople from the Province of Cuneo